Old Harbor Airport  is a state owned, public use airport located two nautical miles (4 km) northeast of the central business district of Old Harbor, a city in the Kodiak Island Borough in the U.S. state of Alaska.

As per Federal Aviation Administration records, the airport had 3,282 passenger boardings (enplanements) in calendar year 2008, 3,226 enplanements in 2009, and 3,177 in 2010. It is included in the National Plan of Integrated Airport Systems for 2011–2015, which categorized it as a non-primary commercial service airport (between 2,500 and 10,000 enplanements per year).

Facilities 
Old Harbor Airport resides at elevation of 55 feet (17 m) above mean sea level. It has one runway designated 3/21 with a gravel surface measuring 2,750 by 60 feet (838 x 18 m).

Airlines and destinations 

Airlines with scheduled passenger service to non-stop destinations:

Statistics

References

External links 
 Topographic map from USGS The National Map
 Airport diagram from FAA Alaska Region

Airports in Kodiak Island Borough, Alaska